Richmond, Virginia, is the capital city of the Commonwealth of Virginia, and the fifth largest city in the state in terms of population, and the main anchor city for the Greater Richmond Region, the third largest metropolitan statistical area in the Commonwealth, and the 43rd largest in the United States. The City of Richmond is divided into five distinct districts, each district is further subdivided into several neighborhoods, although there is no formal criterion as to what defines a neighborhood within the City of Richmond. The five districts of Richmond are Downtown, East End, North Side, Southside, and West End.

Below is a list of neighborhoods in Richmond, Virginia, divided by their district:

Downtown 

 Arts District
 Biotech and MCV
 City Center
 Court End
 Gambles Hill
 Jackson Ward
 Monroe Ward
 Midtown
 Shockoe Bottom
 Shockoe Slip
 Upper Shockoe Valley

East End 

 Brauers
 Chimborazo 
 Church Hill
 Creighton
 Eastview
 Fairfield
 Fairmount
 Fulton Hill
 Montrose Heights
 Mosby
 Navy Hill
 Oakwood
 Peter Paul
 Tobacco Row
 Union Hill
 Witcomb Court

North Side 

 Barton Heights
 Bellevue
 Chamberlayne Industrial Center
 Edgewood
 Gilpin
 Ginter Park
 Green Park
 Hermitage Road
 Highland Park
 Highland Terrace
 Laburnum Park
 Magnolia Industrial Center
 North Highland Park
 Pine Camp
 Providence Park
 Rosedale
  Sherwood Park
 South Barton Heights
 Three Corners
 Washington Park

Southside 

 Ancarrow's Landing
 Bellemeade
 Belmont Woods
 Blackwell
 Brandermill
 Broad Rock
 Brookbury 
 Cherry Gardens
 Chippenham Forest
 Cofer
 Cottrell Farms
 Forest Hill
 Gravel Hill
 Hickory Hill
 Hillside Court
 Huguenot 
 Jahnke 
 Manchester
 Maury
 McGuire
 North Chesterfield
 Northrop 
 Oak Grove
 Oxford
 Piney Knolls
 South Richmond
 Southampton
 Stoney Point
 Stratford Hills
 Swansboro
 Walmsley
 Warwick
 Windsor
 Woodhaven
 Woodland Heights
 Worthington

West End 

 Byrd Park
 Carillon
 Carver
 Carytown
 Colonial Place
 Byrd Park
 The Fan
 Malvern Gardens
 Maymount
 Museum District
 Newtowne West
 Oregon Hill
 Randolph
 Rhoadmiller 
 Scott's Addition 
 Stadium
 Stonewall Court
 West of the Boulevard
 Westhampton
 Willow Lawn
 Wilton
 Windsor Farms

References

External links

Richmond, Virginia
Neighborhoods In Richmond, Virginia